Philip Powers (born 1963) is a record producer - and author - specialising in film scores and classical music. His recordings have been nominated for five ARIA Awards. He has produced 34 CDs for the 1M1 Records label including The Lighthorsemen and The Coolangatta Gold. He has also produced or executive produced more than 50 CDs for the Sydney Symphony Orchestra on Sydney Symphony Live and other labels. A number of these have been with the conductor Vladimir Ashkenazy as well as two CDs with the conductor Gianluigi Gelmetti. Another CD featured Vladimir Ashkenazy as pianist playing rare Rachmaninov works. He was supervising producer of Sir Charles Mackerras, a double CD featuring famous Czech repertoire and Richard Strauss' Also sprach Zarathustra conducted by Sir Charles Mackerras.

Career

Scores 
After his graduation from University of New South Wales having acted in the position of Music Officer for several months in 1984, he was appointed Director of Music for Film Australia in 1986. Between 1983 and 1988 he was responsible for the music appearing in over 200 Film Australia productions, including Cane Toads, also working with Gillian Armstrong and Jane Campion on Bingo, Bridesmaids and Braces and After Hours. He supervised the musical and choreographed sequences in Academy Award-winning director Bruce Petty's The Movers and was the recording producer of the AFI 1984 Best Film Winner Annie's Coming Out which was also nominated for Best Original Music Score, losing to Bruce Smeaton and Garth Porter for Streethero. 18 years later he released the Original Soundtrack Recording on his 1M1 Records label.

He produced his first CDs of film scores for the Southern Cross label in 1988, working with Simon Walker on The Wild Duck and Brian May on Frog Dreaming as well as Tony Bremner on The Everlasting Secret Family.

Other notable film scores which he produced for CD from classic Australian feature films include Robbery Under Arms, The Lighthorsemen, We of the Never Never, The Flying Doctors, Road Games, Patrick, Harlequin, Snapshot, Sky Pirates, Thirst, Devil in the Flesh, Caddie, beDevil, Eliza Fraser and The Coolangatta Gold. Additionally, he produced the CD of Nigel Westlake's score for the four-part television documentary series, The Celluloid Heroes.

He also wrote and produced the scores for a number of plays, documentaries, shorts and animated films. He has also written classical music for orchestra, synthesizers and piano as well as a trio for violin, cello and percussion.

Ironbark Bill (1985) is a 5-episode TV short and a feature short animated film narrated by John Clarke. It played in cinemas in Australia as the animated short before the films Santa Clause (1985) and Crocodile Dundee (1986). "Town Under Threat" is a documentary (which screened on Channel 7's The World Around Us) about the threat of a potentially devastating exploding volcano in Rabaul. "Don't be the Last to Know" is a documentary about the pervading threat of drugs to children in the mid-1980s in Australia, presented by Michael Willesee. "Let 'em Vote" and "Saturday Saturday" were training films for elections in the 1980s. "Combat Zone" was a classified training film for the army in the series, War Administration.

In addition to these were films about accounting for a multicultural society, "The Investigation", the supernatural drama, "The Traveller's Tale", and a documentary produced by Anthony Buckley about the famous Gulflander train (narrated by Bill Peach) which ran from Croydon to Normanton.

Other classical productions 
His work with the Sydney Symphony Orchestra began in 2008 as recording manager, the year before Vladimir Ashkenazy began his five-year tenure as chief conductor. Together they recorded eight CDs of music by Elgar and Prokofiev, with all the symphonies and piano concertos; and in the following three years they collaborated with the Japanese label Exton, and produced another 10 CDs of all of Mahler's symphonies.

In 2014, he accepted a new contract with the orchestra to produce concerts as live webstreams and for video-on-demand.

Other notable releases include contemporary classical music of Elision and a CD with Simon Walker, Guy Gross, Chris Neal and Mark Isaacs on the Music for Pianos, Percussion and Synthesizers CD, which also featured his own work, "Wired".

In 2016, the recording he produced of "Josh Pyke with the SSO" received an ARIA Award.

In 2017, Powers produced two concerts for Foxtel for the SSO, directed a film of the performance of "In Paradisum" by the Sydney Youth Orchestra of a work by George Palmer, and produced four new recordings.

Author 
In 2020 Powers wrote “Black and White: Sidney Poitier's Emergence in the 1960s as a Black Icon”.

Critical reception 
Roger Covell, chief classical music critic for The Sydney Morning Herald, wrote in his 1990 review of the CD, "Simon Walker's Binary has a feeling of severity and power to it; Philip Powers, producer of the disc and its animating spirit, inevitably calls to mind a degree of filmic spookiness with his use of almost-human wails and sighs from electronic sources in his inventive Wired." The article finished with praise for the concept album, Covell writing, "[t]he disc is a useful message from composers who are in the process of working out their place in Australian music. More messages of a similar kind would be welcome."

The Australian Recording Industry Association nominated Powers and the 1M1 label for five ARIA awards: Bloodmoon, Wendy Cracked a Walnut, beDevil and the highly regarded Christ Church St Laurence Choir CD Victoria.

Classical Releases as Executive Producer / Producer

References 

1963 births
Living people
Australian record producers